André Trindade da Costa Neto (born 16 July 2001), simply known as André, is a Brazilian footballer who currently plays as a midfielder for Fluminense.

Club career
Born in Algodão, Ibirataia, Bahia, André joined Fluminense's youth setup in 2013, aged 12. On 21 February 2020, he renewed his contract with the club until 2023.

André made his professional debut on 16 September 2020, coming on as a late substitute for Dodi in a 1–0 home win over Atlético Goianiense, for the year's Copa do Brasil. His first Série A occurred four days later, as he started in a 0–1 away loss against Sport Recife.

André scored his first professional goal on 4 July 2021, netting a last-minute winner in a 1–0 away success over rivals Flamengo. On 4 October, he further extended his contract until the end of 2024.

André, 21, completed his hundredth game for the Laranjeiras club, this Saturday, at 15h, against Atletico-MG, in Mineirão.

Career statistics

Honours

Club
Fluminense
Campeonato Carioca: 2022

Individual
Campeonato Brasileiro Série A Best Newcomer: 2021
Bola de Prata: 2022
Campeonato Brasileiro Série A Team of the Year: 2022

References

External links
Fluminense FC profile 

2001 births
Living people
Sportspeople from Bahia
Brazilian footballers
Association football midfielders
Campeonato Brasileiro Série A players
Fluminense FC players